David Buckingham is a former Associate Justice of the Kentucky Supreme Court.

Education
Buckingham graduated from Murray State University in 1974 and received his Juris Doctor from the University of Louisville School of Law in 1977.

State judicial career
He began his 29-year judicial career in 1982 as a district judge for the 42nd Judicial District. Following that role, Judge Buckingham served as a circuit judge for the 42nd Judicial Circuit from 1987–1996. Judge Buckingham served as a Kentucky Court of Appeals judge from 1997–2005 and as the senior judge on the Kentucky Court of Appeals from 2006–2010.

Appointment to Kentucky Supreme Court
Buckingham was one of three candidates to put forth his name for consideration. On March 27, 2019, Governor Matt Bevin appointed Buckingham to the Supreme Court, to the seat vacated by the retirement of Bill Cunningham. Buckingham remained on the court until December 11, 2019, when former Kentucky Court of Appeals judge Christopher S. Nickell, who had won a special election in November 2019, was sworn in.

References

External links

Living people
Judges of the Kentucky Court of Appeals
Kentucky lawyers
Justices of the Kentucky Supreme Court
Murray State University alumni
University of Louisville School of Law alumni
21st-century American judges
21st-century American lawyers
Year of birth missing (living people)